Rameez Khan (born 31 December 1989) is an Indian first-class cricketer who plays for Madhya Pradesh.

References

External links
 

1989 births
Living people
Indian cricketers
Madhya Pradesh cricketers
People from Sagar, Madhya Pradesh